A by-election for the seat of Subiaco in the Legislative Assembly of Western Australia was held on 10 November 1917. It was triggered by the death of the sitting member, Bartholomew Stubbs of the Labor Party, on 26 September 1917. The election was won by Samuel Brown, a member of the Subiaco Municipal Council who was standing for the Nationalist Party. Brown was one of six candidates endorsed by the Nationalists, and won the seat despite only polling 15.02 percent of the first-preference vote.

Background
Bartholomew Stubbs, a prominent trade unionist, had held Subiaco for the Labor Party since defeating Henry Daglish (a former premier) at the 1911 state election. He enlisted in the Australian Imperial Force in 1916, and was returned unopposed at the September 1917 state election, but was killed in action in Belgium the same month. The writ for the by-election was issued on 23 October 1917, with the close of nominations on 1 November. Polling day was on 10 November, with the writ returned on 13 November.

Results

Aftermath
Brown stood for re-election at the 1921 state election, but was defeated by Walter Richardson of the National Labor Party after failing to make the final two-candidate-preferred count. He committed suicide in August 1923.

See also
 List of Western Australian state by-elections

References

Western Australian state by-elections
1917 elections in Australia
November 1917 events
1910s in Western Australia